Kashiwa may refer to:

 Kashiwa, a city in the prefecture Chiba, Japan
 Kashiwa, Aomori
 Bin Kashiwa (born 1944)
 Hank Kashiwa (born 1949)
 Jeff Kashiwa (born 1963)
 Shiro Kashiwa (1912–1998)
 Yoshifumi Kashiwa (born 1987)
 Yukina Kashiwa (born 1994)
 Kashiwa Airfield
 Kashiwa Angel Cross
 Kashiwa Hitachi Stadium
 Kashiwa Kinen
 Kashiwa Reisoru
 Kashiwa Station
 Kashiwa Yukina
 Kashiwa mochi

Japanese masculine given names
Japanese-language surnames